Newman A. Flanagan (born March 5, 1930) is an American attorney and politician who served as the district attorney of Suffolk County, Massachusetts. He was also a State Deputy of Massachusetts in the Knights of Columbus.

Early life and education
Flanagan was born in the Roslindale neighborhood of Boston. He graduated from Boston College High School in 1947 and served in the United States Navy during the Korean War, where he won three battle stars and a unit citation. In 1954, he graduated from Boston College. He spent two years at Boston College Law School and then transferred to the New England Law Boston, where he graduated in 1957.

Career

In May 1961, he took a job working for Suffolk County District Attorney Garrett H. Byrne and in November 1962 he was made an Assistant District Attorney. He prosecuted 2,500 cases, including a successful manslaughter case against physician Kenneth C. Edelin in 1975 for performing an abortion.

Flanagan resigned his position on December 31, 1977 and ran against Byrne for the position of district attorney. He beat Byrne and three others in the Democratic primary on September 19, 1978 and faced no opposition in the general election. After he resigned in 1992, he became the executive director of the National Association of District Attorneys.

Knights of Columbus

Flanagan joined the Knights of Columbus while at Boston College. He rose through the ranks and was elected State Deputy on May 18, 1980. He served until 1982. His father, James H. Flanagan, was state deputy from 1944 to 1946, making them the only father-son duo to be state deputy in Massachusetts history and only the sixth in the history of the order. His son, Paul A. Flanagan, was elected state deputy in 2018, making them the first three-generation set of state deputies in the history of the Knights of Columbus. He went on to become a supreme director.

Personal life 
His brother, James H. Flanagan, Jr., was a diocesan priest and his brother Joseph F.X. Flanagan was a Jesuit priest. With his wife Eileen P. Gushue he has four sons and three daughters.

References

Works cited

1930 births
District attorneys in Suffolk County, Massachusetts
People from Roslindale
New England Law Boston alumni
Boston College alumni
Boston College High School alumni
United States Navy
Living people